İsmet Atlı (1931 – 4 April 2014) was a Turkish Olympic medalist sports wrestler in the Light heavyweight class and a trainer. He won the gold medal in Men's Freestyle wrestling at the 1960 Olympics.

He was born 1931 in Çukurören village of Kozan district in Adana Province of southern Turkey. He began wrestling in 1950 and was trained by the renowned wrestlers Celal Atik and Yaşar Doğu.

İsmet Atlı competed at several international wrestling events successfully in both wrestling styles and participated at three consecutive Olympic Games in 1952, 1956 and 1960.

After his retirement from the active sports in 1962, İsmet Atlı acted as a trainer. He also worked as a sports journalist.

Achievements
 1951 Mediterranean Games in Alexandria, Egypt - gold (Freestyle Middleweight)
 1952 Summer Olympics in Helsinki, Finland - 5th (Greco-Roman Light heavyweight)
 1953 World Wrestling Championships in Naples, Italy - 4th (Greco-Roman Middleweight)
 1954 World Wrestling Championships in Tokyo, Japan - silver (Greco-Roman Middleweight)
 1955 World Wrestling Championships in Karlsruhe, Germany - 5th (Greco-Roman Middleweight)
 1956 World Wrestling Cup in Istanbul, Turkey - gold (Freestyle Middleweight)
 1956 Summer Olympics in Melbourne, Australia - 4th (Freestyle Middleweight)
 1957 World Wrestling Championships in Istanbul, Turkey - bronze (Freestyle Light heavyweight)
 1960 Summer Olympics in Rome, Italy - gold (Freestyle Light heavyweight)
 1962 World Wrestling Championships in Toledo, Ohio, U.S. - bronze (Greco-Roman Light heavyweight), 4th (Freestyle Light heavyweight)

References

External links
 

1931 births
2014 deaths
Sportspeople from Adana
Wrestlers at the 1952 Summer Olympics
Wrestlers at the 1956 Summer Olympics
Wrestlers at the 1960 Summer Olympics
Turkish male sport wrestlers
Olympic gold medalists for Turkey
Turkish journalists
Olympic medalists in wrestling
Medalists at the 1960 Summer Olympics

Mediterranean Games gold medalists for Turkey
Wrestlers at the 1951 Mediterranean Games
Mediterranean Games medalists in wrestling
20th-century Turkish people
21st-century Turkish people